Thomas Andrew Nalen (born May 13, 1971) is a former American football center who played for the Denver Broncos of the National Football League (NFL).  He was born in Boston and raised in Foxborough, Massachusetts.

College career

Nalen was a three-year starting offensive lineman for Boston College, earning numerous honors that included third-team Associated Press All-America, second-team All-Big East and first-team ECAC. He started every game from 1991 to 1993, serving as backup center and then starting center for the last three games in 1990. He redshirted in 1989.  Nalen closed out his college career with appearances in the East–West Shrine and Senior Bowl games. In 1993, Nalen was an All-American honorable mention  and All-Big East second-team pick by The Poor Man’s Guide to the NFL Draft.  That year, Boston College ranked fourth in the nation in total offense (506.4 yards per game). Nalen's blocking was a key factor in the Eagles' 41–39 upset win over Notre Dame in South Bend, Indiana.

Professional career

Nalen was drafted by the Denver Broncos with the 218th overall pick in the seventh round of the 1994 NFL Draft and played primarily at center.  He won two Super Bowls as a member of the Broncos and played in five Pro Bowls.  Six different running backs have had 1,000-yard rushing seasons behind Nalen and the Broncos' offensive line.

On January 6, 2009, Nalen retired from professional football after spending his entire career playing for the Denver Broncos. He was the last remaining player from the Broncos' Super Bowl titles in the late 1990s.

In 2013, Nalen was named to the Broncos Ring of Fame.

References

External links
 Biography on official NFL website

1971 births
Living people
People from Foxborough, Massachusetts
American football centers
Boston College Eagles football players
Denver Broncos players
American Conference Pro Bowl players
Players of American football from Massachusetts
Ed Block Courage Award recipients